Jack Cvercko was a college football player. A prominent guard for the Northwestern Wildcats, selected an All-American in 1962. He was picked in the 1963 NFL Draft, but a chronic knee injury prevented him from becoming a professional football player. His brother was Andy Cvercko.

References

American football guards
Northwestern Wildcats football players
All-American college football players